Ilythea caniceps is a species of shore flies in the family Ephydridae.

Distribution
United States, Neotropical.

References

Ephydridae
Taxa named by Ezra Townsend Cresson
Insects described in 1918
Diptera of North America
Diptera of South America